Bulgaria has an embassy in Belgrade. Serbia has an embassy in Sofia. Bulgaria is a European Union member state and Serbia is a European Union candidate.

Both countries are full members of the Southeast European Cooperation Process, of the Stability Pact for South Eastern Europe, of the Central European Initiative, of the Southeast European Cooperative Initiative and of the Organization of the Black Sea Economic Cooperation. The countries share 318 km of common borderline.

Bulgaria recognized Kosovo as an independent self-proclaimed country in 2008, which strained relations between two nations, however the two countries enjoy good cooperation in the area of culture, as seen in the examples of co-production of Serbian movies.

History

In 1867, a Bulgarian society, active in Bucharest approached the Serbian state with a draft-agreement. The Bulgarian side proposed the founding of a common Serbo-Bulgarian (Bulgaro-Serbian) dual state called South Slav Tsardom, headed by the Serbian Prince. Serbian Prime minister Garašanin accepted the Bulgarian proposal in a letter from June 1867, but he diplomatically refused to sign the document, fearing how representative this organisation had been. The establishment of this common state concerned other Bulgarian organisations, which perceived it as an implementation of Garašanin's plan called Načertanije.

Despite the cultural similarities, the two countries were enemies during the Second Balkan War and World War I, due to disputes over territory and spheres of influence, such as North Macedonia.

In 2018, Serbia and Bulgaria celebrated 140 years of diplomatic relations.

Serbian Presidents Aleksandar Vučić and Bulgarian PM Boyko Borisov concluded that the opening of the Balkan Pipeline through Bulgaria and Serbia in 2021 was a "remarkable success of the two fraternal states".

See also 
 Foreign relations of Bulgaria
 Foreign relations of Serbia 
 Accession of Serbia to the European Union 
 Bulgaria–Montenegro relations
 Bulgaria–Kosovo relations
 Bulgarians in Serbia
 Serbs in Bulgaria
 Craiova Group
 Bulgaria–Yugoslavia relations

Notes

References

Sources and further reading
Antić, Dejan D. "A view of Serbian-Bulgarian relations at the end of the 19th and at the beginning of the 20th century." Godišnjak Pedagoškog fakulteta u Vranju 7 (2016): 55–67.
 
 Hering, Gunnar. "Serbian-Bulgarian relations on the eve of and during the Balkan Wars.} Balkan Studies (1962) 4#2 pp 297-326.
 
 
 Rossos, Andrew. "Serbian-Bulgarian Relations, 1903-1914." Canadian Slavonic Papers 23.4 (1981) pp 347–378. and 394-408 .

External links 
  Bulgarian embassy in Belgrade
  Serbian Ministry of Foreign Affairs about relations with Bulgaria
  Serbian embassy in Sofia

 
Serbia
Bilateral relations of Serbia